The 2018 Nordic Artistic Gymnastics Championships was an artistic gymnastics competition held in Farum, Denmark. The event was held between 29 June and 1 July.  The competition featured both senior and junior fields.

Medalists

References 

Nordic
Nordic